Iwaak (also spelled I-wak or I'wak) is a South-Central Cordilleran language spoken by almost 3,300 people around the Cordillera Central mountain range of Luzon, Philippines. It is a Pangasinic language which makes it closely related to Pangasinan, one of the regional languages in the country, with around 1.2 million speakers.

According to Ethnologue, in eastern Itogon municipality, Benguet Province, I-wak is spoken in Tojongan, Bakes, Lebeng, Domolpos, Bujasjas, and Kayo-ko villages. It is also spoken in Salaksak village, Kayapa municipality, Nueva Vizcaya Province.

References

Languages of Benguet
South–Central Cordilleran languages